The Final Mission of Extortion 17: Special Ops, Helicopter Support, SEAL Team Six, And The Deadliest Day of The U.S. War in Afghanistan is a book by Ed Darack. It was published on September 19, 2017. It describes the downing of Extortion 17, a U.S. Army CH-47D Chinook helicopter, in the Tangi Valley of Afghanistan's Maidan Wardak Province in the early hours of 6 August 2011. The book focuses on the helicopter's two pilots and three crew members.

The book grew out of Darack's work on his 2015 Air & Space/Smithsonian article, "The Final Flight of Extortion 17". The book examines the event, relying on interviews of people close to events and provides the first complete, accurate accounting of the downing.

Darack interviewed approximately 60 people for the book, including experts in specific areas related to the story. The book provides in-depth analysis on all aspects of the helicopter's downing, including technical details, historical background and information on crew and passengers. Some family members of those killed on Extortion 17 supported Darack's efforts by allowing him to interview them.

According to a May 26, 2017 review in Library Journal, the book effectively rules out conspiracy theories.

Publication 
The hardcover and ebook is published by Smithsonian Books with distribution by Penguin Random House. The audiobook is published by Blackstone Audio.

References

External links
Official website for The Final Mission of Extortion 17

2017 non-fiction books
Military books
Non-fiction books about war
Books about military history
War on Terror books
American non-fiction books
American history books
Aviation books
War in Afghanistan (2001–2021) books